The PZL Bielsko SZD-50 Puchacz (Polish: "eagle owl") is a Polish two-place training and aerobatic sailplane.

Development
The Puchacz was designed by Dipl-Ing Adam Meus based on the prototype SZD-50-1 Dromader. It was intended to serve as the successor to the popular Bocian for training. Its first flight was April 13, 1979.

Being a moderately-priced, versatile, modern two-seater with good handling qualities on the ground and in the air, the Puchacz has become a very popular two-seater sailplane in many countries both for ab-initio and aerobatic instruction.

A large number of fatal accidents involving spins have occurred with the Puchacz. Investigations have failed to uncover a common design flaw, but the type's reputation has nevertheless been tainted. Its supporters point out that it was designed to obey faithfully all control inputs - including foolish ones. Partial failures at the rudder bar and control sticks have been known to occur, but Airworthiness Directives have been issued for modifications.

Description
The Puchacz is a construction protected by polyurethane paint rather than the more usual gelcoat finish. Although it is mainly glassfibre, the fuselage has two wooden frames as the connection point for the wings and undercarriage. Assembly entails inserting a single main pin to secure the wings in place and a spring-loaded locking pin for the tailplane. The air brakes open above and below the wings and are extremely efficient in comparison with other gliders, allowing very steep flight.

It has a tandem seating arrangement for the two occupants with the front seat used for solo flights. The front rudder pedals and the rear seat shell are adjustable. The front instruments are arranged so that they can be easily viewed from the rear seat; a rear instruments panel is also available as an option.

The Puchacz meets both OSTIV and JAR-22 Utility Category certification requirements and is approved for extended aerobatics including inverted flight and rolling manoeuvres.

Variants
SZD-50-1 Dromader The initial design and prototype of the Puchacz series, first flown on 21 December 1976; two built.
SZD-50-2 Puchacz Initial production variant first flown on 13 April 1979.
SZD-50-3 Puchacz Later production standard with fin mounted  higher, enlarged rudder and main-wheel fairing.

Specifications (SZD-50-3)

See also

References

External links

 Geelong Club website
 Richard Johnson, A FTE of the SZD-50-3 Puchacz 2-Place Sailplane, Soaring, April 1994
Sailplane Directory
 Type Certificate EASA 

1970s Polish sailplanes
SZD50
Cruciform tail aircraft
Aircraft first flown in 1979
SZD aircraft
Forward-swept-wing aircraft
Shoulder-wing aircraft